Maureen Connolly successfully defended her title, defeating Doris Hart in the final, 8–6, 7–5 to win the ladies' singles tennis title at the 1953 Wimbledon Championships.

Seeds

  Maureen Connolly (champion)
  Doris Hart (final)
  Shirley Fry (semifinals)
  Dorothy Knode (semifinals)
  Angela Mortimer (quarterfinals)
  Helen Fletcher (fourth round)
  Susan Chatrier (third round)
  Nelly Adamson (fourth round)

Draw

Finals

Top half

Section 1

Section 2

Section 3

Section 4

Bottom half

Section 5

Section 6

Section 7

Section 8

References

External links

Women's Singles
Wimbledon Championship by year – Women's singles
Wimbledon Championships
Wimbledon Championships